Hoosier Academy Virtual Charter School was an online K-12 school sponsored by the state of Indiana, operated by education management organization Stride, Inc.

The school suffered chronically low ratings from the state board of education. The Hoosier Academies Network board decided to shut the school down after the 2017-2018 school year.

References

Online K–12 schools
High schools in Indiana
Charter schools in Indiana
Online schools in the United States
2009 establishments in Indiana